is a Japanese manga artist. He has written and drawn Yume Tsukai (Dream User) and Nazo no Kanojo X (Mysterious Girlfriend X), both of whom were adapted into anime series. Another of his works, Discommunication, had its main characters animated in the 14th OVA episode of Mysterious Girlfriend X as a cameo appearance.

Mysterious Girlfriend X is licensed in North America by Vertical. Discommunication has been licensed by J-Novel Club and is being released in English digitally.

Works 
  (1991–1999, serialized in Afternoon, Kodansha)
  (1998, serialized in Afternoon, Kodansha)
  (1999–2000, serialized in Afternoon, Kodansha)
  (2001–2004, serialized in Afternoon, Kodansha)
  (2004–2014, serialized in Afternoon, Kodansha)
  (2017–2020, serialized in Afternoon, Kodansha)

References

External links 

1969 births
Manga artists from Fukuoka Prefecture
Living people